Indian Mills may refer to:
Indian Mills, New Jersey
Indian Mills, West Virginia